is Kaori Iida's first studio album as a solo artist of Hello! Project and her first album covering songs in European languages. It contains her own rendition of popular European classical songs, such as "La Vie en Rose" and "Garota de Ipanema." It was released on April 23, 2003, when she was still a member of the idol group, Morning Musume.

Track listing

Song details
All songs are arranged by Tomotsune Maeno.

French songs
Cherbourg no Amagasa is best known as "Les Parapluies de Cherbourg" named after the famous musical of the same name. It was originally released on 1964 by Danielle Licari.
Lyrics: Jacques Demy
Composer: Michel Legrand

Barairo no Jinsei is famously known as "La Vie en Rose" and is known as the signature song of Édith Piaf. It was originally released on 1946.
Lyrics: Edith Piaf
Composer: Louiguy
Duration: 3:58

Ipanema no Musume is famously known as "La Fille d'Ipanema" or "Garota de Ipanema" that was composed for the musical comedy, Dirigível.
Lyrics: Vinicius De Moraes
Composer: Antonio Carlos Jobin

Downtown, also known as "Dans le Temps," was released on 1973 by Petula Clark.
Duration: 3:20
Lyrics: Tony Hotch
Composer: Tony Hotch

Otome no Namida is known as "Une Écharpe, Une Rose." It was popularized by Chantal Goya when it was released on 1965.
Lyrics: Roger Dumas
Composer: Jean-Jacques Debout

Suteki na Ōjisama is originally known as "Un Prince Charmant". It was released on January 6, 1976 as a part of France Gall's first album.
Lyrics: Maurice Vidalin
Composer: Jacques Datin

Muzōsa Shinshi is originally known as "L'aquoiboniste." It was released on 1978 by Jane Birkin.
Lyrics: Serge Gainsbourg
Composer: Serge Gainsbourg

Greek songs 
Ehe Ya: Sayōnara is a Greek song, originally written as "Εχε Γειά." It was released on 2000 by Eleftheria Arvanitaki.
Lyrics: Eleni Zioga
Composer: Evanthia Reboutsika

Osavurio: Ai wa Matte Kurenai is originally released on 1967 by Nana Mouskouri with its original title written in Greek alphabet, "Ωςαύριο".
Lyrics: Eleni Zioga
Composer: Evanthia Reboutsika
Duration: 3:11

Italian songs
Amore Scusami is an Italian song popularized by Dalida on 1964.
Lyrics: Vito Pallavinchini
Composer: Gino Mescoli

Charts

External links
 Osavurio: Ai wa Matte Kurenai entry at Up-Front Works Official Website
 Osavurio: Ai wa Matte Kurenai entry at Kaori Iida Database

Kaori Iida albums
Chichūkai Label albums
2003 debut albums